is a Japanese animation studio founded by Eiko Tanaka and Koji Morimoto in 1986. The name comes from the temperature at which water is most dense.

History
Studio 4 °C has produced numerous feature films, OVAs, and shorts. Early film titles include Memories (1995), Spriggan (1998), and Princess Arete (2001). In 2003, through a joint production with Warner Bros., Studio 4 °C created five segments of The Animatrix. The following year, they created the award-winning avant-garde film Mind Game. Studio 4 °C's next film Tekkon Kinkreet (2006), won six awards, including Best Animated Film at the Fantasia 2007, Lancia Platinum Grand Prize at the Future Film Festival, and Japan Academy Prize for Animation of the Year. It was also submitted for 2007 Oscar in Animated Feature Film category of Academy Award in USA.

The year 2007 saw the release of the anthology film Genius Party, a collection of seven short films. Genius Party Beyond, a collection of five short films, was released the following year, as was Batmans side story Gotham Knight, and the OVA series Detroit Metal City. The following year First Squad: The Moment of Truth was awarded at the Moscow International Film Festival. In February 2010, they contributed two shorts to the anthology Halo Legends: "Origins", and "The Babysitter".

Works

Feature films
Memories (1995)
Spriggan (1998)
Princess Arete (2001)
Mind Game (2004)
Tekkonkinkreet (2006)
First Squad: The Moment of Truth (2009)
Berserk: Golden Age Arc
The Egg of the King (2012)
The Battle for Doldrey (2012)
The Advent (2013)
Justice League: The Flashpoint Paradox (2013)
Harmony (2015, part of the Project Itoh trilogy)
Mutafukaz (2017, with Ankama Animations)
Children of the Sea (2019)
Poupelle of Chimney Town (2020)
Fortune Favors Lady Nikuko (2021)

TV series
Macross 7 (1994, opening animation)
Piroppo (2001)
Tweeny Witches (2004)
Kimagure Robot (2004)
Ani*Kuri15 (2007)
ThunderCats (2011) (co-produced with Warner Bros. Animation) 
Chiisana Hana no Uta (2013)
Phoenix: Eden17 (2023)
SWAT Kats: Revolution (TBA) (co-produced with Warner Bros. Animation and Toonz Entertainment)

OVA
Noiseman Sound Insect (1997)
Eternal Family (1997)
Uraroji Diamond (2000)
The Animatrix – "Kid's Story", "The Second Renaissance", "Beyond", "A Detective Story"  (2003)
Hijikata Toshizo: Shiro no Kiseki (2004)
Tweeny Witches: The Adventures (2007)
Batman: Gotham Knight (2008)
Have I Got A Story For You
Working Through Pain
Detroit Metal City (2008)
Street Fighter IV – The Ties That Bind (2009)
Halo Legends (2010)
The Babysitter
Origins
Green Lantern: Emerald Knights (2011)
Kuro no Sumika - Chronus - (Young Animator Training Project, 2014)

Music videos
Ken Ishii – "Extra" (1996)
The Bluetones – "Four Day Weekend" (1998)
Glay – "Survival" (1999)
"Brand New Day" (ミュージッククリップ「BRAND NEW DAY」監督：新井浩一) (2001, Unreleased)
Ayumi Hamasaki – "Connected" (2002)
Ligalize – "Pervyi Otryad" ("First Squad") (2005)
Hikaru Utada - "Fluximation" (2005) (for Exodus)
Hikaru Utada – "Passion" (2006) (Square Enix's Kingdom Hearts II Theme song)

Short films
Gondora (1998)
Digital Juice (2001)
Jigen Loop (2001)
Sweat Punch (5 short films, 2001–2002. Collected and released on DVD in 2007) – "Professor Dan Petory's Blues", "End of the World", "Comedy", "Beyond", and "Junk Town".
Amazing Nuts! Part 1 – Global Astroliner (2006)
Amazing Nuts! Part 2 – Glass Eyes (2006)
Amazing Nuts! Part 3 – Kung Fu Love – Even If You Become the Enemy of the World (2006)
Amazing Nuts! Part 4 – Joe and Marilyn (2006)
Tamala's "Wild Party" (2007)
Genius Party (July 7, 2007) A collection of 7 short films
Genius Party Beyond (February 15, 2008) A collection of 5 short films
The Babysitter (2009) A Halo Legends short portraying the relationship between the Spartans and the ODSTs
My Last Day (2011) – Created in association with The JESUS Film Project, Brethren Entertainment, and Barry Cook
Kid Icarus: Uprising – "Medusa's Revenge" (2012) – Promotional short for Kid Icarus: Uprising video game
Drive Your Heart (2013) Spin-off to PES-peace eco smile, short film produced to advertise Toyota
Tuzuki: Love Assassin (2014)<ref>Tuzki: Love Assassin '</ref>Turnover (2015) adaptation from the manga of the same name, for advertising purpose for BenesseKanjo ga Kanji o Sukina Riyū Part 1 and Part 2 (2015)Red Ash: Gearworld (2017)

Video gamesAce Combat 04: Shattered Skies (2001)Tube Slider (2003) Summon Night 3 (2003)Ape Escape: Pumped & Primed (2004)Ace Combat 5: The Unsung War (2004)Rogue Galaxy (2005)Lunar Knights (2006)Jeanne D'Arc (2006)Ace Combat X: Skies of Deception (2006)Street Fighter IV (2008).hack//Link (2010)Zack & Ombra: The Phantom Amusement Park (2010)Catherine (2011)Hard Corps: Uprising (2011)Asura's Wrath (2012)Toukiden (2013)Tokyo Mirage Sessions ♯FE (2015)Guardian's Violation (2015)Doodle Champion Island Games (2021)

Commercials
Nike – LeBron James In Chamber of Fear (Self Doubt) (2004)
Honda Edix presents Edix Six – kiro (2006)

OtherKamikaze Girls (2004) – Animated segmentLincoln (2005) – Opening animation and character designsKurosagi (2006) – Opening animationDonju (2009) – Animated segment
 My Last Day (2011) – A short Easter anime Campus Crusade for Christ
 PES-peace eco smile (2012) – Series of shorts produced to advertise Toyota
 The Amazing World of Gumball (2016) – Dragon Ball manga-style flashback sequence and Kill la Kill-style fight sequence between Nicole and Masami's mother, Yuki for the season four episode "The Fury"
 Doodle Champion Island Games (2021) – Google Doodle
 Ballmastrz: Rubicon'' (2023) — A TV special

References

External links
  
 
Interview with Yukie Saeki of 4°C on ''Shining Force Neo'''s 2D animation
Honda Edix presents Edix Six page

 
Animation studios in Tokyo
Japanese animation studios
Mass media companies established in 1986
Japanese companies established in 1986